Keasbey is a census-designated place (CDP) and unincorporated community located within Woodbridge Township, in Middlesex County in the U.S. state of New Jersey. It is located on the western outskirts of Perth Amboy. Through its proximity to Perth Amboy, and through natural outflow, attraction, and migration, Keasbey is also home to many Hispanic or Latino families.

Keasbey was originally known as Florida Grove due to its picnic areas and beaches on the Raritan River. 

The town is named after the Keasbey family, whose home in Morristown is now Macculloch Hall, a museum. One of the brick manufacturers established in Keasbey was a Keasbey family company.

Demographics

Education
Residents are zoned to the Woodbridge Township School District.
Grade K-5: Lafayette School 25
Grade 6-8: Fords Middle School
Grade 9-12: Depending on location. J.F.K. Memorial High School or Woodbridge High School.

In media
The third wave ska band Catch 22 referenced Keasbey in the title of their album Keasbey Nights in 1998. It was later re-recorded by Streetlight Manifesto in 2006.

Companies
Major employers include:
 FedEx Ground, a division of FedEx, operates a regional hub
 Wakefern, ShopRite's owner and distributor, has its corporate headquarters here

References

External links
Keasbey at Woodbridge Township official website

Census-designated places in Middlesex County, New Jersey
Neighborhoods in Woodbridge Township, New Jersey
Unincorporated communities in Middlesex County, New Jersey
Unincorporated communities in New Jersey